The 1974 World Figure Skating Championships were held at the Olympiahalle in Munich, West Germany from March 5 to 10. At the event, sanctioned by the International Skating Union, medals were awarded in men's singles, ladies' singles, pair skating, and ice dance.

The ISU Representative was Jacques Favart of France and the ISU Technical Delegate was Josef Dědič of Czechoslovakia.

Medal table

Results

Men

Referee:
 Elemér Terták 

Assistant Referee:
 Benjamin Wright 

Judges:
 Milan Duchón 
 Geoffrey Yates 
 Dorothy Leamen 
 Kinuko Ueno 
 Walburga Grimm 
 Tatiana Danilenko 
 Norman E. Fuller 
 Néri Valdes 
 Hans Fuchs 

Substitute judge:
 Leena Vainio

Ladies

Referee:
 Sonia Bianchetti 

Assistant Referee:
 János Zsigmondy 

Judges:
 Michele Beltrami 
 Pamela Peat 
 Helga von Wiecki 
 Kikuko Minami 
 René Schlageter 
 David Dore 
 Yvonne S. McGowan 
 Eva von Gamm 
 Ingeborg Nilsson 

Substitute judge:
 Ludwig Gassner

Pairs

Referee:
 Donald H. Gilchrist 

Assistant Referee:
 Erika Schiechtl 

Judges:
 Liliane Caffin-Madaule 
 Miroslav Hasenöhrl 
 Walburga Grimm 
 Pamela Davis 
 Eva von Gamm 
 Dorothy Leamen 
 Maria Zuchowicz 
 Valentin Piseev 
 Ardelle K. Sanderson 

Substitute judge:
 Jürg Wilhelm

Ice dance

Referee:
 Lawrence Demmy 

Assistant Referee:
 Hans Kutschera 

Judges:
 Jürg Wilhelm 
 Maria Zuchowicz 
 Mary Louise Wright 
 Klára Kozári 
 Willi Wernz 
 Dagmar Řeháková 
 Irina Absaliamova 
 Audrey Moore 
 Pauline Borrajo 

Substitute judge:
 Lino Clerici

Sources
 Result list provided by the ISU

World Figure Skating Championships
World Figure Skating Championships
World Figure Skating Championships
World Figure Skating Championships
International figure skating competitions hosted by West Germany
Sports competitions in Munich
1970s in Munich
March 1974 sports events in Europe